A by-election for the seat of Hume in the New South Wales Legislative Assembly was held on 17 April 1901 because of the resignation of Sir William Lyne to successfully contest the federal seat of Hume.

Dates

Result

Sir William Lyne resigned to successfully contest the federal seat of Hume.

See also
Electoral results for the district of Hume
List of New South Wales state by-elections

Notes

References

1901 elections in Australia
New South Wales state by-elections
1900s in New South Wales